Eirenis modestus, commonly known as ring-headed dwarf snake or simply the dwarf snake, is a species of snake in the Colubridae family. It is native to several Greek islands, Turkey, Syria, Armenia, Azerbaijan, Israel,  Lebanon and southwestern parts of the Russian Federation.

Description
The ring-headed dwarf snake is a pencil-thin species that grows to a maximum length of  but most adults are considerably smaller than this. The skin is smooth and the edges of the scales are slightly darker than the centres. The upper surface of the body is a uniform yellowish-brown, greyish-brown or reddish-brown colour and the underparts are glossy white. The top of the head has a large black blotch inside which are either two whitish spots or a pale "W"-shaped mark. Round the neck is a crescent-shaped band of dark blotches separated from the head by a pale band.

Subspecies 
Currently, three subspecies are recognized, namely Eirenis modestus modestus (MARTIN 1838), E. m. semimaculatus (BOETTGER 1876) from central and western Turkey (Anatolia), and E. m. cilicius (SCHMIDTLER 1993) from southern Turkey.

Distribution and habitat
The ring-headed dwarf snake is native to the Greek Mediterranean islands of Lesbos, Chios, Samos, Alzonisi, Kalymnos, Leros, Symi and Megisti and most of Turkey. Its range extends eastwards into the Caucasus Mountains, eastern Georgia, Armenia and Azerbaijan. Its natural habitats are dry shrubby vegetation, cultivated fields, fallow areas and dry open woodland.

Behaviour
During the day the ring-headed dwarf snake shelters under stones or in crevices, and several snakes may share the same hiding place. It emerges at twilight to hunt for spiders, insects, centipedes, scorpions and small lizards. Breeding takes place in summer when the female lays a clutch of three to eight relatively large eggs.

Status
The ring-headed dwarf snake has a wide range and is presumed to have a large total population. It seems to be an adaptable species able to tolerate a range of different habitat types, and no particular threats have been identified and for these reasons, the IUCN has listed it as being of "Least Concern".

References

Eirenis
Reptiles described in 1838
Reptiles of Turkey
Reptiles of Syria
Reptiles of Armenia
Reptiles of Azerbaijan
Reptiles of Russia